The 1985 All-Ireland Senior Hurling Championship Final was the 98th All-Ireland Final and the culmination of the 1985 All-Ireland Senior Hurling Championship, an inter-county hurling tournament for the top teams in Ireland. The match was held at Croke Park, Dublin, on 1 September 1985, between Offaly and Galway. The Connacht men lost to their Leinster opponents on a score line of 2-11 to 1-12.

Match details

All-Ireland Senior Hurling Championship Final
All-Ireland Senior Hurling Championship Final, 1985
All-Ireland Senior Hurling Championship Final
All-Ireland Senior Hurling Championship Finals
Galway GAA matches
Offaly GAA matches